The Meaning of 8 is the seventh studio album by the experimental indie rock band Cloud Cult.

Track listing
All songs written by Craig Minowa.
 "Chain Reaction" (download) – 4:28
 "Please Remain Calm" – 3:55
 "Chemicals Collide" – 3:16
 "Pretty Voice" (download) – 3:45
 "Brain Gateway" – 3:31
 "Take Your Medicine" (download) – 4:41
 "Your 8th Birthday" – 4:06
 "Dance for the Dead" – 3:48
 "Everywhere All at One Time" – 1:07
 "Purpose" (download) – 3:47
 "A Good God" – 2:34
 "The Shape of 8" – 1:30
 "The Girl Underground" – 2:47
 "2x2x2" – 4:16
 "Thanks" – 3:45
 "Alien Christ" – 3:39
 "The Deaf Girl's Song" – 3:43
 "Hope" – 4:09
 "Song of the Deaf Girl" – 1:28

B-Side
 "May Your Lives Be Long" - 4:18
 "Step Forward" - 3:22
 "818" - 3:21

External links
The Meaning of 8 page at CloudCult.com

2007 albums
Cloud Cult albums